Jiří Růžička (born 12 May 1948) is a Czech pedagogue and politician who served as the acting President of the Senate of the Czech Republic following the death of Jaroslav Kubera.

References

1948 births
Politicians from Prague
Presidents of the Senate of the Czech Republic
TOP 09 Senators
Charles University alumni
Living people